Chorkor is a fishing village and a neighbourhood in the Accra Metropolis district, a district in the Greater Accra Region of Ghana. The Chorkor oven got its name from here. Chorkor is a densely populated community. Ga-Dangme is the largest ethnic group in Chorkor, followed by Akan. Chorkor has electricity, water pipes, schools, and clinics. Chorkor is popularly known for being the birthplace of the Azonto dance.

References 

Accra
Populated places in the Greater Accra Region
Fishing communities
Fishing communities in Ghana